Milda ventricosa, common name the ventricose pyram, is a species of small to medium-sized  sea snail, a marine gastropod mollusk in the (mostly minute) family Pyramidellidae, the pyram snails.

Distribution 
This species is found in the western and central tropical Indo-West Pacific; also off Japan and Australia (Northern Territory, Queensland)

Description 
The length of the shell varies between 15 mm and 33 mm.

The shell is ovate, turreted, polished, pointed at its summit, indistinctly striated in its whole length. The spire is composed of ten slightly convex whorls. The withish body whorl is a little swollen. All the whorls are adorned with longitudinal, undulated, reddish, or brown lines, quite near together. Wide, brown spots often partially cover them, a line equally brown passes over each whorl. Upon the body whorl are found three others, which sometimes form quite large bands of the same color. The sutures are slightly canaliculated. The ovate aperture is whitish, marked likewise, with a few brown lines towards the depth of the cavity, exhibiting pretty distinct furrows. The outer lip is thin, terminated below by a small siphonal canal, at its union with the columella. The columella is slightly arcuated, with three folds at its base, the first very prominent. The umbilicus is indistinctly marked. From the base juts out a round fold, which is seen to turn in a spiral manner in the umbilicus. The ovate operculum is membranous, its laminae not spiral, having one or two notches to receive the folds of the columella.

References 

 Guérin, F.E. 1831. Pyramidella ventricosa Guérin. Magasin de Zoologie Classe V Mollusques 1(1): pl. 2, figs 1,2
 Quoy, J.R.C & Gaimard, J.P. 1832. Voyage de Découvertes de l'Astrolabe exécuté par Ordre du Roi, Pendant les Années 1826-1827-1828-1829, sous le commandement de M.J. Dumont d'Urville. Zoologie. Paris : J. Tastu Vol. 2 320 pp.
 Adams, A. 1853. Family Pyramidellidae. pp. 228–235 in Adams, H. & Adams, A. The genera of Recent Mollusca arranged according to their organization. London : John Van Voorst Vol. 1(Parts I-VIII) pp. 1–256, pls 1-32.
 Adams, A. 1854. Monographs of the genera Eulima, Niso, Leiostraca, Obeliscus, Pyramidella and Monoptygma. pp. 793–825 in Sowerby, G.B. (ed.). Thesaurus Conchyliorum or monographs of genera of shells. London : Sowerby Vol. 2 pp. 439–899.
 Reeve, L.A. 1865. Monograph of the genus Pyramidella. pls 1-6 in Reeve, L.A. (ed). Conchologia Iconica. London : L. Reeve & Co. Vol. 15.
 Tryon, G.W. 1886. Manual of Conchology, structural and systematic: with illustrations of the species. Series 2 Philadelphia : Published by the author Vol. 8 pp. 461, pls 79.
 Clessin, S 1902. Die Familie der Eulimidae. Systematisches Conchylien-Cabinet von Martini und Chemnitz 1(28): 1-273, pls 1-41
 Dall, W.H. & Bartsch, P. 1904. Synopsis of the genera, subgenera and sections of the family Pyramidellidae. Proceedings of the Biological Society of Washington 17: 1-16
 Allan, J.K. 1950. Australian Shells: with related animals living in the sea, in freshwater and on the land. Melbourne : Georgian House xix, 470 pp., 45 pls, 112 text figs.
 Laseron, C. 1959. The family Pyramidellidae (Mollusca) from northern Australia. Australian Journal of Marine and Freshwater Research 10: 177-267, figs 1-213 
 Rippingale, O.H. & McMichael, D.F. 1961. Queensland and Great Barrier Reef Shells. Brisbane : Jacaranda Press 210 pp.
 Cernohorsky, W.O. 1972. Marine Shells of the Pacific. Sydney : Pacific Publications Vol. 2 411 pp., 68 pls.
 Tantanasiriwong, R. 1978. An illustrated checklist of marine shelled gastropods from Phuket Island, adjacent mainland and offshore islands, Western Peninsula, Thailand. Phuket Marine Biological Center, Research Bulletin 21: 1-22, 259 figs
 Coleman, N. 1981. What shell is that? Sydney : Lansdowne Press, Sydney 308 pp.
 Springsteen, F.J. & Leobrera, F.M. 1986. Shells of the Philippines. Manila : Carfel Seashell Museum 377 pp., 100 pls.
 Short, J.W. & Potter, D.G. 1987. Shells of Queensland and The Great Barrier Reef. Drummoyne, NSW : Golden press Pty Ltd 135 pp., 60 pl.
 Higo, S., Callomon, P. & Goto, Y. (1999) Catalogue and Bibliography of the Marine Shell-Bearing Mollusca of Japan. Elle Scientific Publications, Yao, Japan, 749 pp. page(s): 356
 Okutani, T. 2000. Marine mollusks in Japan. Tokai University Press 1173 pp.

External links 
 

Pyramidellidae
Gastropods described in 1831